The following table summarizes symbols and abbreviations used in cytogenetics:

See also
Chromosome abnormalities
Directionality (molecular biology) for 3' and 5' notation
locus (genetics) for basic notational system
International System for Human Cytogenetic Nomenclature

References

Cytogenetics